Echelus pachyrhynchus is an eel in the family Ophichthidae (worm/snake eels). It was described by Léon Vaillant in 1888. It is a marine, deep water-dwelling eel which is known from the eastern Atlantic Ocean, including Morocco, Angola, Cape Verde, and Namibia. It dwells at a depth range of 200–500 metres, and inhabits burrows in mud or sand on the continental shelf. Males can reach a maximum total length of 48.5 centimetres.

Echelus pachyrhynchus feeds primarily on bony fish.

References

Ophichthidae
Fish described in 1888